Sikkim Democratic Front (SDF)  is a regional political party in the Indian state of Sikkim. It was the ruling party in Sikkim from 12 December 1994 to 23 May 2019.

History 
The party was founded by Pawan Kumar Chamling in 1993. It has ruled the Sikkim state from 1994 to 2019 with Pawan Kumar Chamling as the chief minister. The party consolidated its position sweeping the 1999 and 2004 state elections. It won 31 of the 32 assembly seats in the 2004 election. In the 2009 assembly election, the party made a clean sweep, winning all 32 seats. It also retained the lone Lok Sabha seat. In 2014 assembly elections, SDF won 22 seats and retained power.

In May 2016, after the BJP led NDA formed its first government in Assam, a new alliance called the North-East Democratic Alliance (NEDA) was formed with BJP leader Himanta Biswa Sarma as its convener. The Chief Ministers of the north eastern states of Sikkim, Assam, Manipur, Arunachal Pradesh and Nagaland too belong to this alliance. Thus, the Sikkim Democratic Front joined the NDA led NEDA.

Pawan Kumar Chamling resigned as CM after 2019 Sikkim Legislative Assembly election as former member Prem Singh Tamang's Sikkim Krantikari Morcha party formed the  government by winning 17 seats out of 32. SDF party won the remaining 15 seats. But in August 2019, 10 MLAs quit his party to join the Bharatiya Janata Party and in the same month two other legislators joined Sikkim Krantikari Morcha. Thus making Pawan Kumar Chamling the only MLA of his party.

Frontal Organisation
Youth Wing
Student's Wing
Women's Wing
Labour Wing
Cultivators and Organic Farmers Wing
Ex-servicemen Wing
Scheduled Tribe Welfare Wing
Scheduled Caste Welfare Wing
Drivers Wing
Traders Wing

List of Chief Minister

Electoral records 
 Sikkim Legislative Assembly election

 Lok Sabha election, Sikkim

See also
 Elections in Sikkim

External links
 Chief Electoral Officer, Sikkim
 Sikkim Assembly, Sikkim

References

 
Political parties in Sikkim
Political parties established in 1993
1993 establishments in Sikkim